The Elusive Corporal is a 1962 French film directed by Jean Renoir that stars Jean-Pierre Cassel, Claude Brasseur, and Claude Rich. It was entered into the 12th Berlin International Film Festival.

Renoir shot his film in Austria in 1961 from Jacques Perret's book based on his own prisoner of war experiences. Renoir's friend and assistant director Guy Lefranc had also been a World War II prisoner of war and had developed the project for seven years. The story serves as a companion piece to the director's 1937 film, Grand Illusion, once more bringing together men from across the broad social spectrum of French society to depict one man's Sisyphean efforts to escape captivity in a German POW camp.

Plot
Among over a million French prisoners of war taken to work in camps in Germany in 1940 is the Corporal, a young man of good background who, finding the oppressiveness of Nazi Germany and the misery of prison life unbearable, makes repeated efforts to escape. Escapes from a logging camp, a brick factory, and a dairy farm all result in recapture, followed by weeks in a punishment camp. Taken into town for dental treatment, he wins the affection of the dentist's teenage daughter, Erika.

His last foray, with two companions, uses the trick of measuring the roadway through the camp gates and then disappearing once in open country. Ringing at the dentist's door, Erika lets them in and, when asked for civilian clothes, she kits them out. Taking a train. they are identified as foreigners by a passenger and the military police are called. At that moment the train runs into an Allied bombing raid, upon which everybody jumps out. Escaping cross country, they encounter a farmer who proves to be another French escapee: he gives them food and describes a safe route to the frontier. The Corporal and his remaining companion part on a bridge in Paris, free men among friends in the country they love.

Cast
 Jean-Pierre Cassel as Le caporal / The Corporal
 Claude Brasseur as 'Papa' / 'Pop'
 O. E. Hasse as Le voyageur ivre dans le train
 Claude Rich as Ballochet
 Jacques Jouanneau as Penche-à-gauche
 Sacha Briquet as L'évadé grimé en vielle femme
 Raymond Jourdan as Hippolyte Dupieu
 Guy Bedos as Le prisonnier qui bégaye
 Philippe Castelli as Le prisonnier électricien
 Gérard Darrieu as L'homme qui louche / The cross-eyed man
 Cornelia Froboess as Erika Schmidt (as Conny Froboess)

Production
Guy Lefranc was assistant director on the film. The film's sets were designed by the art director Wolf Witzemann. Location shooting took place around Paris and Vienna.

References

External links

1962 films
1960s war comedy films
French war comedy films
1960s French-language films
French black-and-white films
World War II prisoner of war films
Military humor in film
Films based on French novels
Films set in Germany
Films shot in Austria
Films shot in Paris
Films directed by Jean Renoir
Pathé films
1962 comedy films
Films scored by Joseph Kosma
1960s French films